Khanqah (also Romanized as Khānqāh and Khāneqāh; also known as Khanakakh and Khānegāh) is a village in Golabar Rural District, in the Central District of Ijrud County, Zanjan Province, Iran. At the 2006 census, its population was 311, in 83 families.

References 

Populated places in Ijrud County